Omonia Ormideia is a Cypriot association football club based in Ormideia, located in the Larnaca District. Its stadium is the Ormideia Municipality Stadium.

References

Football clubs in Cyprus
Association football clubs established in 1956
1956 establishments in Cyprus